Robert Joseph Mulvey (24 November 1868 – 24 April 1937) was a trade union secretary and member of the Queensland Legislative Council.

Mulvey was born at Brisbane, Queensland, to William Mulvey and his wife Margaret Holmes (née McKechnie) and was educated in Brisbane. He secretary of the Moulders' Union from 1897 to 1908, secretary of the Eight-Hour Day Committee from 1906 to 1923, and secretary of the Queensland Trades and Labor Council from 1923 to 1935.

Political career
When the Labour Party starting forming governments in Queensland, it found much of its legislation being blocked by a hostile Council, where members had been appointed for life by successive conservative governments. After a failed referendum in May 1917, Premier Ryan tried a new tactic, and later that year advised the Governor, Sir Hamilton John Goold-Adams, to appoint thirteen new members whose allegiance lay with Labour to the council.

In 1920, the new Premier Ted Theodore appointed a further fourteen new members to the Council with Mulvey amongst the appointees. He served for two years until the council was abolished in March 1922.

Personal life
Mulvey died in Brisbane in April 1937 and was buried at the Redcliffe Cemetery.

References

Members of the Queensland Legislative Council
1868 births
1937 deaths
Australian Labor Party members of the Parliament of Queensland
People from Brisbane